St Dunstan's Farm Meadows is a  biological Site of Special Scientific Interest south-east of Heathfield in East Sussex. It is in the High Weald Area of Outstanding Natural Beauty.

This site has three unimproved meadows which are traditionally managed. They are dominated by red fescue and common bent grass and other flora include sweet vernal-grass, pignut, sheep's sorrel and field woodrush.

A footpath crosses one of the fields.

References

External links
Countryside Classroom, Places to Visit, St Dunstan's Farm

Sites of Special Scientific Interest in East Sussex